The Church of Christ in China Ming Yin College is an aided Christian co-educational secondary school in Kowloon, Hong Kong next to Shek Kip Mei station.

History
The Church of Christ in China Ming Yin College was established in 1966. It is an aided Christian co-educational secondary school and is located on a 3,300 sq. m. campus, which is considerably small for a secondary school.

Extracurricular activities
Altogether, there are 39 societies and uniform groups which provide diversified extra-curricular activities to students. Local and overseas visits, trips and study tours are organized to broaden students' horizons. Sadly, not all students are able to afford it because most students come from lower-class families, with many of the parents being Chinese mainland immigrants.

2020 Mycosa Homecoming Day 
Due to the novel coronavirus infection, the Alumni Homecoming Day held on 28 March has been deferred until further notice.

References

External links

Educational institutions established in 1966
Secondary schools in Hong Kong
Christian organizations established in 1966
1966 establishments in Hong Kong